Kurbo is a digital therapeutics program focused on sustainable healthy eating for children and teenagers. The program tracks and manages nutrition, exercise and weight of adolescents. It operates through a mobile application and a website, providing health coaching from weight loss and behavior change professionals to tackle childhood obesity.

Kurbo was acquired by WW International (formerly Weight Watchers) in August 2019 and continues to operate as a subsidiary of WW.

History 

Kurbo was founded in July 2013 in Palo Alto, California by Joanna Strober, Mark Vershel and Thea Runyan. Strober had a teenage son who struggled with his weight. Unable to find a suitable weight loss program for children and teenagers, she collaborated with Runyan, who was a coach at the Pediatric Weight Control Program at Stanford Children’s Hospital, and Vershel to build a health and weight management program for adolescents. The program is based on research on pediatric weight control and is licensed from Stanford University Lucile Packard Children’s Hospital pediatric obesity program. It is known for its traffic light food classification system and portion sizing design.

Functionality 

Kurbo is designed to teach children how to manage their eating habits in an educational manner. It provides a single set of APIs for the mobile application and online program to track and access activity data of the users. It is accompanied by interaction with a health and behavioral coach who provide personalized suggestions, feedback and encouragement to the users.

Studies and feedback 

A pilot program in 2014 demonstrated that Kurbo improved engagement and helped children reduce their BMI percentile.  The Journal of Medical Internet Research published a study in 2019 on Impact of a Mobile App-Based Health Coaching and Behavior Change Program on Participant Engagement and Weight Status of Overweight and Obese Children. This study analyzed the effectiveness of Kurbo’s program and inferred that increased coaching sessions led to increased BMI reduction.

A New York Times article by dietician Christy Harrison and a statement by the National Eating Disorders Association (NEDA) opposed the use of the app raising concern over children’s diet and psychological implications.

References

External links 

Health software
2013 establishments in the United States
Companies based in Palo Alto, California